Palaeoconchus is a genus of microconchid tubeworms. 
Their tubes have pseudopunctae penetrating the tube wall. Tubes lumen is smooth. Palaeoconchus occurs in the Late Ordovician of Baltica and Avalonia.
In the Devonian it had a global distribution.

References

Protostome enigmatic taxa
Tentaculita
Ordovician invertebrates
Silurian animals
Devonian animals
Late Devonian animals
Devonian animals of Europe
Late Ordovician first appearances
Devonian extinctions